Domingo Jesús Ramón Menargues (born March 10, 1958 in Crevillente, Alicante) is a retired long-distance runner from Spain, known for winning the bronze medal in the men's 3000 m steeplechase event at the 1982 European Championships in Athens, Greece. He represented his native country in two Summer Olympics (1980 and 1984). Ramón set his personal best (8:15.74) in the event on July 21, 1980 at the 1980 Summer Olympics in Moscow. 

He was twice a competitor at the World Championships in Athletics, in 1983 and 1987, and was also a four-time champion of Spain in 3000 m steeplechase, in 1980 (8:29.40), 1981 (8:21.09), 1982 (8:27.07), and 1984 (8:29.91).

Competition record

References

1982 Year Ranking

1958 births
Living people
People from Crevillent
Sportspeople from the Province of Alicante
Spanish male long-distance runners
Spanish male steeplechase runners
Olympic athletes of Spain
Athletes (track and field) at the 1980 Summer Olympics
Athletes (track and field) at the 1984 Summer Olympics
World Athletics Championships athletes for Spain
European Athletics Championships medalists
Mediterranean Games silver medalists for Spain
Athletes (track and field) at the 1979 Mediterranean Games
Athletes (track and field) at the 1983 Mediterranean Games
Mediterranean Games medalists in athletics